Eighth Amendment may refer to:

Eighth Amendment to the United States Constitution, part of the United States Bill of Rights
Eighth Amendment of the Constitution of Ireland, which recognized the equal right to life of an unborn child
Eighth Amendment to the Constitution of Pakistan, which changed Pakistan's government from a parliamentary system to a semi-presidential system
Eighth Amendment of the Constitution of South Africa, which allowed members of municipal councils to cross the floor from one political party to another without losing their seats